The  St. Louis Cardinals season was the team's 42nd season in the National Football League (NFL) and their second in St. Louis. The team improved on their previous year's 6–5–1 record, winning seven games. Despite the improvement, they finished fourth in the seven-team Eastern Conference and failed to qualify for the playoffs (NFL title game) for the thirteenth consecutive season. The Cardinals were led by fourth-year head coach Pop Ivy, who was replaced after a 5–7 start by the tandem of Chuck Drulis, Ray Prochaska, and Ray Willsey.

This was the final season of ownership by Violet Bidwill Wolfner, who died in January 1962 at age 62.

Roster

Schedule

Game Summaries

Week 1 at NY Giants 
the Cardinals, supposedly crippled beyond repair, came roaring through with a fine display of offensive firepower to upset the New York Giants. The Cards razzle-dazzle offense was on display despite losing John David Crow and Joe Childress. But Sam Etcheverry, another cripple, cranked up Frank Ivy's offense and sent fullback Mal Hammack on a 28-yard touchdown run that overcame a 10-7 Giants lead, then fired a five-yard screen pass to another fullback Frank Mestnik, for another score. The Cards defense also was effective. The Giants' "new look" offense was badly frustrated and surrendered the first St. Louis Cardinals touchdown when halfback Bob Gaiters fumbled in the end zone and Willie West recovered for a touchdown. The Giants only scoring was a 44-yard field goal by Pat Summerall and a Larry Hayes return of a block punt for a touchdown.

Standings

References

External links 
 1961 St. Louis Cardinals at Pro-Football-Reference.com
 1961 St. Louis Cardinals Football Highlights at youtube.com

1961
St. Louis Cardinals